Haplogroup E-V68, also known as E1b1b1a, is a major human Y-chromosome DNA haplogroup found in North Africa, the Horn of Africa, Western Asia and Europe. It is a subclade of the larger and older haplogroup, known as E1b1b or E-M215 (also roughly equivalent to E-M35). The E1b1b1a lineage is identified by the presence of a single nucleotide polymorphism (SNP) mutation on the Y chromosome, which is known as V68. It is a subject of discussion and study in genetics as well as genetic genealogy, archaeology, and historical linguistics.

E-V68 is dominated by its longer-known subclade E-M78. In various publications, both E-V68 and E-M78 have been referred to by other names, especially phylogenetic nomenclature such as "E3b1a" which are designed to show their place on the family tree of all human males. These various names change as new discoveries are made and are discussed below.

Origins

E-M78, like its parent clade E-V68, is thought to have an African origin. Based on genetic STR variance data,  suggests that this subclade originated in "Northeastern Africa", which in the study refers specifically to the region of Egypt and Libya.

This was because of the high frequency and diversity of E-M78 lineages in the region of Ethiopia. However,  were able to study more data, and concluded that the E-M78 lineages in the Horn of Africa were dominated by relatively recent branches (see E-V32 below). They concluded that the region of Egypt was the likely place of origin of E-M78 based on "the peripheral geographic distribution of the most derived subhaplogroups with respect to northeastern Africa, as well as the results of quantitative analysis of UEP and microsatellite diversity".

 also note this as evidence for "a corridor for bidirectional migrations" between Northeast Africa (Egypt and Libya in their data) on the one hand and East Africa on the other. Because  also proposed that E-M35, the parent clade of E-M78, originated in East Africa during the Palaeolithic and subsequently spread to the region of Egypt. E-M78 in East Africa, is therefore the result of a back migration. The authors believe there were "at least 2 episodes between 23.9–17.3 ky and 18.0–5.9 ky ago".

Another probable migration to the south from Egypt was noted by  based upon their survey of Sudan. Specifically E-V12 and E-V22, "might have been brought to Sudan from North Africa after the progressive desertification of the Sahara around 6,000-8,000 years ago".

Northwards from Egypt and Libya, E-M78 migrated into the Middle East, but additionally  proposed that the earlier E-V68 carrying population may have migrated by sea directly from Africa to southwestern Europe, because they observed cases of E-V68* (without the M78 mutation) only in Sardinia, and not in the Middle Eastern samples. Concerning E-M78, like other forms of E-V68 there is evidence of multiple routes of expansion out of an African homeland.

On the other hand, while there were apparently direct migrations from North Africa to Iberia and Southern Italy (of people carrying E-V68*, E-V12, E-V22, and E-V65), the majority of E-M78 lineages found in Europe belong to the E-V13 subclade which appears to have entered Europe at some time undetermined from the Near East, where it apparently originated, via the Balkans.

Coming to similar conclusions as the Cruciani and Trombetta team, writing prior to the discovery of E-V68, describe Egypt as "a hub for the distribution of the various geographically localized M78-related sub-clades" and, based on archaeological data, they propose that the point of origin of E-M78 (as opposed to later dispersals from Egypt) may have been in a refugium which "existed on the border of present-day Sudan and Egypt, near Lake Nubia, until the onset of a humid phase around 8500 BC. The northward-moving rainfall belts during this period could have also spurred a rapid migration of Mesolithic foragers northwards in Africa, the Levant and ultimately onwards to Asia Minor and Europe, where they each eventually differentiated into their regionally distinctive branches".

The division of E-V68 into sub-clades such as E-V12, E-V13, etc. has largely been the work of an Italian team including Fulvio Cruciani, Beniamino Trombetta, Rosario Scozzari and others. They started on the basis of STR studies in 2004, and then in 2006 they announced the discoveries of single nucleotide polymorphism (SNP) mutations which could define most of the main branches with better clarity, which was then discussed further in 2007.

Keita (2008) examined a published Y-chromosome dataset on Afro-Asiatic populations and found that a key lineage E-M35/E-M78, sub-clade of haplogroup E, was shared between the populations in the locale of original Egyptian speakers and modern Cushitic speakers from the Horn. These lineages are present in Egyptians, Berbers, Cushitic speakers from the Horn of Africa, and Semitic speakers in the Near-East. He noted that variants are also found in the Aegean and Balkans, but the origin of the M35 subclade was in East Africa, and its clades were dominant in a core portion of Afro-Asiatic speaking populations which included Cushitic, Egyptian and Berber groups, in contrast Semitic speakers showed a decline in frequency going west to east in the Levantine-Syria region. Keita identified high frequencies of M35 (>50%) among Omotic populations, but stated that this derived from a small, published sample of 12. Keita also wrote that the PN2 mutation was shared by M35 and M2 lineages and this defined clade originated from East Africa. He concluded that "the genetic data give population profiles that clearly indicate males of African origin, as opposed to being of Asian or European descent" but acknowledged that the biodiversity does not indicate any specific set of skin colors or facial features as populations were subject to microevolutionary pressures.

Loosdrecht et al. (2018) analysed genome-wide data from seven ancient Iberomaurusian individuals from the Grotte des Pigeons near Taforalt in eastern Morocco. The fossils were directly dated to between 15,100 and 13,900 calibrated years before present. The scientists found that all the male specimens with sufficient nuclear DNA preservation belonged to the E1b1b1a1 (M78) subclade, with one skeleton bearing the E1b1b1a1b1 parent lineage to E-V13. Martiniano et al. (2022) later reassigned all the Taforalt samples to haplogroup E-M78 and none to E-L618, the predecessor to EV13.

Age
 estimated that E-M78 (called E1b1b1a1 in that paper) has been in Europe longer than 10,000 years. And more recently,  found that human remains excavated in a Spanish funeral cave dated to approximately 7000 years ago were in the E-V13 branch of E-M78.

In June 2015, the M78 mutation and the consequent beginning of the E-M78 and E-V68 family trees was dated by Trombetta et al. to approximately 20,300-14,800 years ago.

Family tree
This phylogenetic tree of haplogroup  subclades is based on the ISOGG 2019 tree.

Distribution 

E-M78 is widely distributed in North Africa, Horn of Africa, West Asia (stretching as far as Southern Asia), and Europe.

The most basal and rare E-M78* paragroup has been found at its highest frequencies in Egyptians from the Gurna Oasis (5.88%), with lower frequencies also observed in Moroccan Arabs, Sardinians, the Balkans, and Andalusians from Huelva.

The highest frequencies of all the defined E-M78 sub-clades is primarily found amongst Afroasiatic-speaking populations in the large area stretching from the haplogroup's putative place of origin in Upper Egypt to the Sudan and the Horn of Africa.

Outside of this core area of distribution (North Africa and the Horn of Africa), E-V68 is also observed in other parts of the continent at lower frequencies due to more recent dispersals. It is thus found today in pockets of the African Great Lakes and Southern Africa owing to early Afro-Asiatic-speaking settlers from the Horn region, and as far west as Guinea-Bissau, where its presence has been tentatively attributed to trans-Saharan movements of people from North Africa.

The distribution of E-V68 in Europe is dominated by its E-V13 subclade, except in Iberia. E-V13 has a frequency peak centered in parts of the Balkans (approximately 20% in southern areas; up to almost 50% is some particular places and populations) and Italy. It today has lower frequencies toward the western, central and northeastern areas, though E-V13 has been found in a Neolithic burial in Catalonia. This is discussed in more detail below.

Subclades of M78

Listed here are the main subclades of M78 as of June 2015. Within the E-M78 subclade, Trombetta et al. 2015 allocated most of the former E-M78* chromosomes to three new distinct branches: E-V1083*, E-V1477 and E-V259. The first is a paragroup sister to clades E-V22 and E-V13. The mutation V1477 defines a new basal branch observed only in one northern African sample. Finally, a sister clade of E-V12, defined by V264, includes E-V65 and a new central African lineage defined by V259. The rare M78 subhaplogroup E1b1b1a1-PF2186 has been found at highest frequencies among the Toubou population inhabiting Chad (21%).

E-M78 (E1b1b1a1) North Africa, Horn of Africa, West Asia, Europe (formerly E1b1b1a).
E-M78* 
E-V1477 Found in Tunisian Jews.
E-V1083
PF2186 Found among Toubou in Lake Chad area.
E-V1083* Found only in Eritrea (1.1%) and Sardinia (0.3%).
E-V13 (E1b1b1a1b)
E-V22 (E1b1b1a1s)
E-V1129
E-V12 (E1b1b1a1a)
E-V12*
E-V32 (E1b1b1a1a2)
E-V264
E-V259 Found in Chadic (Afro-Asiatic) speakers from Northern Cameroon.
E-V65 (E1b1b1a1d)

E-V12

This subclade of E-M78 is the one which appears to have split from the others first (it arose c. 13.7-15.2 kya).

Undifferentiated E-V12* lineages
Undifferentiated E-V12* lineages (not E-V32 or E-M224, so therefore named "E-V12*") peak in frequency among Southern Egyptians (up to 74.5%). The subclades are also scattered widely in small amounts in both Northern Africa and Europe, but with very little sign in Western Asia, apart from Turkey. These E-V12* lineages were formerly included (along with many E-V22* lineages) in Cruciani et al.'s original (2004) "delta cluster", which he had defined using Y-STR profiles. With the discovery of the defining SNP,  reported that V12* was found in its highest concentrations in Egypt, especially Southern Egypt.  report a significant presence of E-V12* in neighboring Sudan, including 5/33 Copts and 5/39 Nubians. E-V12* made up approximately 20% of the Sudanese E-M78. They propose that the E-V12 and E-V22 sub-clades of E-M78 might have been brought to Sudan from their place of origin in North Africa after the progressive desertification of the Sahara around 6,000–8,000 years ago. Sudden climate change might have forced several Neolithic cultures/people to migrate northward to the Mediterranean and southward to the Sahel and the Nile Valley. The E-V12* paragroup is also observed in Europe (e.g. amongst French Basques) and Eastern Anatolia (e.g. Erzurum Turks).

The non-basal subhaplogroup E1b1b-V12/E3b1a1 has been found at highest frequencies among various Afroasiatic-speaking populations in eastern Africa, including Garreh (74.1%), Gabra (58.6%), Wata (55.6%), Borana (50.0%), Sanye (41.7%), Beja (33.3%) and Rendille (29.0%).

Sub-clades of E-V12

E-M224

E-M224 has been found in Israel among Yemeni population (5%) and appears to be a minor subclade.

E-V32

 suggest that this subclade of E-V12 originated in North Africa, and then subsequently expanded further south into the Horn of Africa, where it is now prevalent.  Before the discovery of V32,  referred to the same lineages as the "gamma cluster", which was estimated to have arisen about 8,500 years ago. They stated that "the highest frequencies in the three Cushitic-speaking groups: the Borana from Kenya (71.4%), the Oromo from Ethiopia (32.0%), and the Somali (52.2%). Outside of eastern Africa, it was found only in two subjects from Egypt (3.6%) and in one Arab from Morocco".  found it extremely prominent in Somali men and stated that "the male Somali population is a branch of the Horn African population – closely related to the Oromos in Ethiopia and North Kenya (Boranas)" and that their gamma cluster lineages "probably were introduced into the Somali population 4000–5000 years ago". More recently,  typed 147 males from Somalia for 12 Y-STR loci, and observed that 77% (113/147) had typical E-V32 haplotypes. This is currently the highest frequency of E-V32 found in any single sample population. Similarly,  in their study observed this to be the most common of the sub-clades of E-M78 found in Sudan, especially among the Beja, Masalit and Fur. The Beja, like Somalis and Oromos, speak an Afro-Asiatic language and live along the "corridor" from the Horn of Africa to Egypt.  interpret this as reinforcing the "strong correlation between linguistic and genetic diversity" and signs of relatedness between the Beja and the peoples of the Horn of Africa such as the Amhara and Oromo. On the other hand, the Masalit and Fur live in Darfur and speak a Nilo-Saharan language. The authors observed in their study that "the Masalit possesses by far the highest frequency of the E-M78 and of the E-V32 haplogroup", which they believe suggests "either a recent bottleneck in the population or a proximity to the origin of the haplogroup." However, More recently,  typed 147 males from Somalia for 12 Y-STR loci, and observed that 77% (113/147) had typical E-V32 haplotypes. This is the highest frequency of E-V32 found in any single sample population.

The STR data from  concerning E-V12 can be summarized as follows.

E-V13

All known positive tests for V13 are also positive for V36. So E-V13 is currently considered "phylogenetically equivalent" to E-V36.

According to some authors E-V13 appears to have originated in Greece or the southern Balkans and its presence in the rest of the Mediterranean is likely a consequence of Greek colonization. Within Europe, E-V13 is especially common in the Balkans and some parts of Italy. In different studies, particularly high frequencies have been observed in Kosovo Albanians (45.6%), Macedonian Albanians (34.4%), Albanians (32.29%), and in some parts of Greece (ca. 35%). More generally, high frequencies have also been found in other areas of Greece, and amongst Bulgarians, Romanians, Macedonians and Serbs.

Within Italy, frequencies tend to be higher in Southern Italy, with particularly high results sometimes seen in particular areas; for example, in Santa Ninfa and Piazza Armerina in Sicily. High frequencies appear to exist also in some northern areas for example around Venice, Genoa and Rimini, as well as on the island of Corsica and the region of Provence in south France, and is also found in scattered and small amounts in Libyan Jews and Egypt, but this is most likely a result of migration from Europe or the Near East.

E-V13 and ancient migrations
The apparent movement of E-M78 lineages from the Near East to Europe, and their subsequent rapid expansion, make its E-V13 subclade a particularly interesting subject for speculation about ancient human migrations.  

It was concluded that northeastern Africa, rather than eastern Africa, was where the E-M78 chromosomes began dispersing to other regions. The most plausible scenario is that E-V13 originated in Western Asia. A hypothesis is that E-M78 carriers devoid of V13 mutation left Africa and that the coalescence occurred later in the Near East/Anatolia. Data suggests that Western Asian carriers of V13 expanded in Europe at earliest 5300 years ago. The TMRCA of European V13 is 4700–4000 years ago. Phylogenetic analysis suggest that the European v13 spread through Europe from the Balkans in a "rapid demographic expansion". 

Before then, the SNP mutation, V13 apparently first arose in West Asia around 10 thousand years ago, and although not widespread there, it is for example found in high levels (>10% of the male population) in Turkish Cypriot and Druze Arab lineages. The Druze are considered a genetically isolated community, and are therefore of particular interest. This means that Druze E-V13 clustered together with most E-V12 and E-V22, and not with European E-V13, which was mostly in the alpha cluster.

Early migration from the Middle East to Europe
The distribution and diversity of V13 are often thought to represent the introduction of early farming technologies, during the Neolithic expansion, into Europe by way of the Balkans. The haplogroup J2b (J-M12) has also frequently been discussed in connection with V13, as a haplogroup with a seemingly very similar distribution and pre-history. (There is no consensus regarding the circumstances or timing of its evolution.)

 says there were at least four major demographic events which have been envisioned for this geographic area:
The "post-Last Glacial Maximum expansion (about 20 kya)"
The "Younger Dryas-Holocene reexpansion (about 12 kya)"
The "population growth associated with the introduction of agricultural practices (about 8 kya)"
The "development of Bronze technology (about 5kya)"

The last two seem within the timespan possible for V13 given its STR age of arise putatively in the Middle East. In favor of the agricultural connection, human remains excavated in a Spanish funeral cave dating from approximately 7000 years ago were shown to be in this haplogroup.

However, earlier entry into Europe is also possible. , for example, propose that the E-M78* lineage ancestral to all modern E-V13 men moved rapidly out of a Southern Egyptian homeland, in the wetter conditions of the early Holocene; arrived in the Balkans with only Mesolithic technologies and then only subsequently integrated with Neolithic cultures which arrived later in the Balkans.

E-V13 is in any case often described in population genetics as one of the components of the European genetic composition which shows a relatively recent link of populations from the Middle East, entering Europe and presumably associated with bringing new technologies. As such, it is also sometimes remarked that it is a relatively recent genetic movement out of Africa into Eurasia, and has been described as "a signal for a separate late-Pleistocene migration from Africa to Europe over the Sinai ... which is not manifested in mtDNA haplogroup distributions".

After its initial entry in Europe, there was then a dispersal from the Balkans into the rest of Europe. Also for this movement, a wide range of possibilities exists.  suggest that the E-V13 subclade of E-M78 originated in situ in Europe, and propose that the first major dispersal of E-V13 from the Balkans may have been in the direction of the Adriatic Sea with the Neolithic Impressed Ware culture often referred to as Impressa or Cardial. The above-mentioned find of archaic E-V13 in Spain supports this suggestion.

In contrast,  suggest that the movement out of the Balkans may have been more recent than 5300 years ago. The authors suggest that for the most part, modern E-V13 descends from a population which remained in the Balkans until the Balkan Bronze Age. They consider that "the dispersion of the E-V13 and J-M12 haplogroups seems to have mainly followed the river waterways connecting the southern Balkans to north-central Europe".  propose the Vardar-Morava-Danube rivers as a possible route of Neolithic dispersal into central Europe.  proposes a still more recent dispersal out of the Balkans, around the time of the Roman empire.

This fossil belonged to the E1b1b1a1b (V13) subclade, and possessed identical haplotypes as found in modern European individuals (five Albanians, two Provence French, two Corsicans, two Bosnians, one Italian, one Sicilian, and one Greek). The presence of this haplogroup in Neolithic Spain suggests that it is associated with the Neolithic agricultural package. The ancient farmer also bore the U5 mtDNA clade, an early European maternal haplogroup. His autosomal STR markers were likewise most typical of Europe. Additionally, the specimen was homozygous C/C for the LP-13910-C/T lactase persistence SNP, indicating that he was lactose intolerant. 

Loosdrecht et al. (2018) found one skeleton, at the Grotte des Pigeons near Taforalt in eastern Morocco, which carried haplogroup E1b1b1a1b1 predecessor to EV13. The skeleton has been directly dated to between 15,100 and 13,900 calibrated years before present. Martiniano et al. (2022) later reassigned all the Taforalt samples to haplogroup E-M78 and none to E-L618, the predecessor to EV13. Fernandes et al. (2016) and Lipson et al. (2017) detected haplogroup E-L618 in two individuals from Hungary and Croatia ascribed to the Lengyel culture.

Greek soldiers in Pakistan
Both E-M78 and J-M12 have also been used in studies seeking to find evidence of a remaining Greek presence in Afghanistan and Pakistan, going back to the time of Alexander the Great.

This study however tested only for M78, and not V13, the typical type of M78 from the Balkans. More recent and detailed analyses of E-V13 in this region have however concluded that this hypothesis is incorrect, and that the variants found there are not the types typical of the Balkans. Instead "Afghanistan's lineages are correlated with Middle Easterners and Iranians but not with populations from the Balkans"

Ancient Britain
Significant frequencies of E-V13 have also been observed in towns in Wales, around Chester (ancient Deva Victrix) in England, and Scotland.

Some scholars (e.g.  have attributed the presence of E-V13 in Great Britain, especially in areas of high frequency, to Roman settlement during the 1st through 4th centuries CE. The Roman Army including men of Balkan ancestry, including Thracians, Illyrians and Dacians.

It is also notable that E-V13 appears to be absent in modern central England, especially the West Midlands and South Midlands.   notes that the collective genetic profile of the English Midlands is similar to that of the Dutch province of Friesland, which was not colonised by Rome, but was, like England, subject to Anglo-Saxon settlement. The so-called "E3b hole" in Central England, according to Steven Bird, may reflect a population replacement – of Romano-British people by Anglo-Saxons.   raises the possibility of "apartheid"-type, elite dominance social structures in Anglo-Saxon England.  concurs: "The 'E3b hole' suggests that either (a) a massive displacement of the ... Romano-British population by invasion or, (b) the substantial genetic replacement of Romano-British Y-DNA through an elite dominance ("apartheid") model... Regardless of the mechanism, the Central England region ... with its lack of E3b haplotypes, is the area having the most "striking similarity in the distribution of Y-chromosomes" with Friesland."

Sub-clades of E-V13
Although most E-V13 individuals do not show any known downstream SNP mutations, and are therefore categorized as E-V13* there are several recognized sub-clades, all of which may be very small. These are one of two cases where  remarked that at the time of that article, it was not certain that the two clades were truly separate ("the positions of these mutations have not been resolved because of a lack of a DNA sample containing the derived state at V27").
E-V27. Defined by V27.  found one case in Sicily.
E-P65. Defined by P65.
E-L17. Defined by L17.
E-L143. Defined by L143.
E-M35.2. Defined by M35.2.
E-L241. Defined by L241.
E-L250. Defined by L250, L251, and L252.

E-V22

The highest frequency of E-V22 has thus far been observed among the Samaritan Levites at 100% frequency,

Other frequencies reported by  include Moroccan Arabs (7.27%, 55 people), Palestinians (6.9% out of 29 people).  found a 7% presence in the UAE.

Sub-clades of E-V22
There are two recognized sub-clades, which are apparently separate, although  remarked that at the time of that article, "the positions of these mutations have not been resolved because of a lack of a DNA sample containing the derived state at [...] V19".
E-M148 Defined by M148.  found 1 example in the Indian subcontinent.  calls M148 "rare and rather uninformative".
E-V19 Defined by V19.  found 2 exemplars in Sardinia.

E-V65
This subclade, equivalent to the previously classified "beta cluster", is found in high levels in the Maghreb regions of far northern Africa.  report levels of about 20% amongst Libyan Arab lineages, and about 30% amongst Moroccan Arabs. It appears to be less common amongst Berbers, but still present in levels of >10%. The authors suggest a North African origin for this lineage. In Europe, only a few individuals were found in Italy and Greece. The results from the article can be summarized as follows...

 studied the beta cluster in Europe. They found small amounts in Southern Italy, but also traces in Cantabria, Portugal and Galicia, with Cantabria having the highest level in Europe in their study, at 3.1% (5 out of 161 people). Next to Cantabria,  found high frequencies of E-V65 among Basque autochthonous inhabitants of Alava province (17.3%), Vizcaya province (10.9%), and Guipuzcoa province (3.3%).

E-M521
This subclade's discovery was announced in  They found 2 out of 92 Greeks to have this mutation.

Phylogenetics

Phylogenetic history

Prior to 2002, there were in academic literature at least seven naming systems for the Y-Chromosome Phylogenetic tree. This led to considerable confusion. In 2002, the major research groups came together and formed the Y-Chromosome Consortium (YCC). They published a joint paper that created a single new tree that all agreed to use. Later, a group of citizen scientists with an interest in population genetics and genetic genealogy formed a working group to create an amateur tree aiming at being above all timely.  The table below brings together all of these works at the point of the landmark 2002 YCC Tree. This allows a researcher reviewing older published literature to quickly move between nomenclatures.

Research publications
The following research teams per their publications were represented in the creation of the YCC tree.

See also

Genetics

Y-DNA E subclades

Y-DNA backbone tree

Notes

Sources for conversion tables

References

. Also at http://www.ucl.ac.uk/tcga/tcgapdf/Behar-AJHG-03.pdf and https://web.archive.org/web/20090304100321/http://www.familytreedna.com/pdf/400971.pdf

 also at 

 Also see Supplementary Data.

 

 

. See comment on Dienekes blog, comment on the Spitoon blog and public release.

. Published online April 2, 2008. See also Supplementary Material.

 
. (Also see Errata)

.

 

. Published online 9 March 2005

.

.

External links
E-M35 Phylogeny Project Wiki
E-M35 Phylogeny Project (all labs site)
E-M35 Phylogeny Project Public Forum

E3b
Mediterranean